Spes Bona High School is a school in Cape Town, Western Cape, South Africa. It has no more than 200 students in 2019.

References

Schools in Cape Town